Linden House is a historic home located at Marietta, Lancaster County, Pennsylvania. It was built about 1813–1814, and is a three-story, five bay, "L"-shaped brick dwelling in the Federal style. In the 1840s, the house was occupied by a boys' boarding school.

It was listed on the National Register of Historic Places in 1983.

References

Houses on the National Register of Historic Places in Pennsylvania
Federal architecture in Pennsylvania
Houses completed in 1814
Houses in Lancaster County, Pennsylvania
National Register of Historic Places in Lancaster County, Pennsylvania